Slade Alive! – The Live Anthology is a two-disc live compilation album by the British rock band Slade. It was released in August 2006 by Salvo. It reached No. 191 in the UK.

The anthology includes the band's entire collection of officially released live material, with the exception of the 1982 B-Side "Merry Xmas Everybody (Live & Kickin')". Disc one contains the 1972 album Slade Alive! and the 1978 follow-up Slade Alive, Vol. 2. Disc two contains 1982's Slade on Stage and the material from the two 1980 extended plays Alive at Reading and Xmas Ear Bender.

Track listing

Disc one

Disc two

Chart performance

Personnel
Slade
Noddy Holder - lead vocals, rhythm guitar
Dave Hill - lead guitar, backing vocals
Jim Lea - bass, backing vocals
Don Powell - drums

Additional personnel
Chas Chandler - producer of Slade Alive! and Slade Alive, Vol. 2
Slade - producers of Slade on Stage, Alive at Reading and Xmas Ear Bender

References

2006 compilation albums
2006 live albums
Slade compilation albums
Slade live albums